FC Germania Helsinki (FCGH) is a sports club from Greater Helsinki, Finland, playing  association football.

History 
The club was formed by German-speaking immigrants in 2015 and formally established in 2017. It has been a Registered association and member of the Football Association of Finland since 2018. FC Germania is listed among the official German institutions in Finland. The sports club has about 60 members, among them many immigrants from the German speaking area and Finns with family ties to Germany, Austria or Switzerland.

Germania's first men's team plays in Vitonen. The second men's team, called FC Germania/Akademie, plays in Kutonen and there is another men's team, called FC Germania Hki 2015, playing in Helsinki's hobby league. A youth section was established in 2021 with a mixed team at preschool age training at the German School Helsinki. During the winter saison 2018–19 even a women's team, called FCGH Ladies, was playing.

The Club Chairman is the lawyer Tim Becker, who was born in the former GDR and has been living in Vantaa since 2007. The German professional player Thomas Dähne, who won both the Finnish League and Finnish League Cup in 2017, has been an honorary member since the club's foundation.

Season to season

Notable club members 
 Benjamin Bachler, former Austrian professional player
 Thomas Dähne, German professional player
 Mia Heikkinen, musician
 Ewald Kibler, former Austrian professional player
 Torsten Tiebout, musician

See also 
 Football Association of Finland
 Germans in Finland

Links and References 

Official Website
Club profile, Suomen Palloliitto
Interwiew with two executive committee members, Finntastic.de
Interwiew with two players from 1st squad, Fussballbotschafter.de

Footnotes

Football clubs in Finland
Association football clubs established in 2017
2017 establishments in Finland
German diaspora in Europe